Nue Nreca (born 25 June 2001) is a Kosovan professional footballer who plays as a left-back for Croatian club Hrvatski Dragovoljac.

Club career

Gjakova
Nreca started playing football in Gjakova and was part of the youth team until 2 September 2018, where he was promoted and made his debut with Gjakova's first team in the league first match against Pashtriku, but he was sent off after receiving red card in the final minutes of the match and was subsequently sentenced with two non-match games.

Vëllazëria and Rahoveci
On 13 February 2020, Nreca joined Second Football League of Kosovo club Vëllazëria. At the end of the summer transfer period on 27 August 2020, he was transferred to other Second Football League of Kosovo club Rahoveci, where he stayed until January 2021, where he joined Fushë Kosova, but after 24 hours he terminated his contract with Fushë Kosova and was returned to Rahoveci where he extended the contract with them.

Hrvatski Dragovoljac
On 20 July 2021, Nreca signed his first professional contract with Croatian First Football League side Hrvatski Dragovoljac after agreeing to a three-year deal. Nineteen days later, he made his debut in a 1–2 home defeat against Osijek after being named in the starting line-up.

References

External links

2001 births
Living people
Sportspeople from Gjakova
Association football fullbacks
Kosovan footballers
Kosovan expatriate footballers
Kosovan expatriate sportspeople in Croatia
Croatian Football League players
NK Hrvatski Dragovoljac players